The Yugoslav First Federal Football League (Serbian: Прва савезна лига у фудбалу / Prva savezna liga u fudbalu), was the premier football league in the Kingdom of Yugoslavia (1918–1941) and Socialist Federal Republic of Yugoslavia (1945–1992).

The First League Championship was one of two national competitions held annually in Yugoslavia, the Yugoslav Cup being the other.

The league became fully professional in 1967.

The UEFA recognised successor league of the Yugoslav First League, the First League of FR Yugoslavia, despite the succession and same name "Prva savezna liga", it is covered in a separate article.

Kingdom of Yugoslavia (1923–1940)
This was the first club competition on a national level for clubs from Kingdom of Yugoslavia (named the Kingdom of Serbs, Croats and Slovenes until 1930). The league was started in 1923 and the first four seasons had a cup tournament format, while the first round-robin league competition was held in 1927. In the period from 1927 to 1940 seventeen seasons were completed, with all the titles won by clubs from Croatia (Građanski Zagreb, Concordia Zagreb, HAŠK Zagreb and Hajduk Split) or Serbia (BSK Belgrade and Jugoslavija Belgrade).

It was governed at first by the Croatian-named Nogometni Savez Jugoslavije (Football Association of Yugoslavia), founded in April 1919 in Zagreb, until in late 1929 disagreements arose between the Zagreb and Belgrade branches of the association. This resulted in the association headquarters being moved to Belgrade in May 1930 where it adopted the Serbian name Fudbalski Savez Jugoslavije and continued operating the league until it was suspended due to the outbreak of World War II. Consequently, with the moving of headquarters, Croatian players and coaches boycotted Yugoslav national team. With the Axis invasion of Yugoslavia, separate Croatian and Serbian leagues were established, which operated during the World War II.

Champions and top scorers

Performance by clubs

World War II competitions
 Serbian Football League (1940–44), in Serbia (Territory of the Military Commander in Serbia)

SFR Yugoslavia (1945–1992)

Champions and top scorers

Titles by club

Titles by republic

Performance by club

 *Known as BSK Belgrade before 1957

All-Time First Yugoslav League table
Top 12 only:

Best finish in Europe by club

Table only shows best-finish achievements in major European/Intercontinental competitions during the SFR Yugoslavia period (1945–1992). 
No minor European tournaments (like Mitropa Cup) included. 
Table sorted by success at European Cup / UEFA Champions League first and foremost.

While the Inter-Cities Fairs Cup is recognised as the predecessor to the UEFA Cup, it was not organised by UEFA. Consequently, UEFA do not consider clubs' records in the Fairs Cup to be part of their European record. However, FIFA do view the competition as a major honour.

All time top goalscorers

Complete list of players who scored 100 goals or more in the 1946-1992 SFR Yugoslavia period.Source: RSSSF; Last updated 14 December 2007

Notable clubs (at least 10 top-flight seasons or at least one title) 
Over the years the Yugoslav First League featured many different teams, but there were always a number of teams that stood out, typically from the bigger cities. Among these were:

UEFA coefficients

The following data indicates historical Yugoslav coefficient rankings among European football leagues.

Successor leagues 

The 1990–91 season was the last season held in its usual format, with clubs from all federative units participating in the championship. The breakup of the country also broke up its top-flight league into several smaller ones.

Slovenia and Croatia depart 
In June 1991 Slovenia declared independence and Croatia followed suit in October of the same year. This meant that their football associations separated from the Football Association of Yugoslavia so they both started their own football leagues. The Slovenian PrvaLiga was launched in late 1991, while the Croatian Prva HNL saw its first edition in 1992. Affected by the ongoing war in Croatia, the season was held over the course of a single calendar year, from February to June 1992. Both leagues have been going on ever since.

1991–92 season 
The 1991–92 season was the last season held officially under the name of SFR Yugoslavia, even though Slovenian and Croatian clubs have already abandoned the competition to play in their own leagues. Clubs from the remaining four federative units all took part in the competition, but since the Bosnian War broke out towards the end of the season, Bosnian clubs never finished it, with Željezničar of Sarajevo only managed to play 17 out of 33 scheduled fixtures, while Sloboda Tuzla and Velež Mostar ended the season with a few games short of completing the season. Still, since most of the games were played as planned, Crvena Zvezda of Belgrade is credited with winning the last Yugoslav First League championship.

Macedonia and FR Yugoslavia 
Macedonian clubs abandoned the competition after the 1991–92 season because the new Macedonian First League was launched the following season. For the 1992–93 season Bosnian clubs were all on hiatus due to full blown fighting that developed there, with the sole exception of Borac of Banja Luka (the strongest Bosnian Serb side at the time) which temporarily moved to Belgrade and joined the newly formed league featuring clubs from Serbia and Montenegro, this time restyled as the First League of FR Yugoslavia. (Serbia and Montenegro, the only ones left after other four member republics declared independence, renamed their country Federal Republic of Yugoslavia.) The league lasted under that name until the 2002–03 season, when the country changed its name so the league was renamed First League of Serbia and Montenegro. Finally, in June 2006 Montenegro declared independence and peacefully departed the union, so from the 2006–07 season onwards Montenegro started operating separate top-flight football league supervised by its football association. On the other hand, as the legal successor of Serbia-Montenegro state union, Serbia also got the continuity of the country's league that was formed as Prva liga (First League) in 1992, and renamed and rebranded as Superliga in summer 2005.

Bosnia and Herzegovina 
Bosnia and Herzegovina proclaimed independence in late winter 1992, and already in April same year N/FSBiH applied for membership with FIFA and UEFA. Meanwhile, due to the outbreak of Bosnian War in April 1992 no games were played in the 1992–93 season. In late 1993 some parts of the country re-launched football competitions with reduced scope. But just as the country was divided along ethnic lines, so was football.

In 1993 Bosnian Croats launched the First League of Herzeg-Bosnia in which only Croatian clubs competed on parochial scale within the limits of West Herzegovina and few other enclaves. In the same year Bosnian Serbs also organized their own First League of the Republika Srpska, on a territory held by Republika Srpska regime at the time.
Only football on a territory under the control of then Republic of Bosnia and Herzegovina institutions and auspices of N/FSBiH, at the time consequently with Bosniak majority, apart from a brief competition for the season 1994–95 (won by Čelik Zenica), came to a standstill. 
Competition under auspices of N/FSBiH did not resume until 1995–96 season when the First League of Bosnia and Herzegovina was launched.

These three separate football leagues were operating in Bosnia and Herzegovina until 1998, and 2000. Since FIFA and UEFA showed support only for the association operating under patronage of the official and internationally recognized state institutions, during the war and prior to Dayton Peace Agreement as well as after its signage, they endorsed unification of all three organizations as N/FSBiH. This also came as a consequence of FIFA decision to recognize N/FSBiH already in July 1996, while in the same year UEFA admitted N/FSBiH as an adjacent member until 1998 when they recognized its full membership. This meant that only N/FSBiH clubs and its national team could compete at the international and official level.

Final unification has been preceded by several stages. At first was created a playoff where clubs were playing for the champion under N/FSBiH auspices. Idea was that playoff under unified N/FSBiH auspices should bring together clubs competing under three separate organizations for the first time but was rejected by Serb association, leaving clubs from Croat football association and N/FSBiH participating playoff for the seasons 1997–98 and 1999–00, while 1998–99 playoff was canceled due to Croat's association hesitation on the decision on which stadiums games should be played. Next season playoff was resumed for the last time prior to full and final agreement on unified N/FSBiH and its competition, Premier League BiH (Premijer Liga), in the fall 2000. However, the first 2000–01 season seen clubs from Federation of BiH only, while clubs from Republic of Srpska entity continue to compete in their own separate league as their entity association still refused to join agreed unified N/FSBiH and its new competition. However, UEFA and FIFA never intended to recognize this separate organization nor its competition, which meant clubs couldn't compete outside territory of the entity and wouldn't see any international football. This situation forced clubs to insist that their organization also join N/FSBiH, and two years later they became part of the competition for the season 2002–03. Ever since the year 2000 Premier League is the top tier of Bosnia and Herzegovina football, with two entity-based leagues, First League of Republika Srpska and First League of the Federation of BiH, being pushed to the second tier of the football pyramid and serve as feeder leagues to Premier League.

Today's top flight successors
  → Premier League of Bosnia and Herzegovina (2000–present; from 1994 to 2000 had a First League of Bosnia and Herzegovina)
  → Prva HNL (1992–present)
  → Football Superleague of Kosovo (2016–present)
  → Macedonian First League (1992–present)
  → Montenegrin First League (2006–present; from 1992 to 2006 had a joint league with Serbia)
  → Serbian SuperLiga (2006–present, from 1992 to 2006 had a joint league with Montenegro)
  → Slovenian PrvaLiga (1991–present)

UEFA recognised FR Yugoslavia and subsequently Serbia as the only official successor of Yugoslavia and consequently the clubs from FR Yugoslavia kept the ranking and ponctuation within UEFA.

See also
Yugoslav Cup
Serbian Football League (1940–44)
Football Association of Yugoslavia
Yugoslavia national football team

Notes and references

Notes

{| style="margin-left:13px; line-height:150%"
|align="right" valign="top"|A.
|

References

 
Yugoslavia
1
Sports leagues established in 1923
1923 establishments in Yugoslavia
1992 disestablishments
football